Catoosa County is a county located in the northwestern part of the U.S. state of Georgia. As of the 2020 census, the population was 67,872. The county seat is Ringgold. The county was created on December 5, 1853.  The meaning of the Cherokee language name "Catoosa" is obscure: "Catoosa" may come from the Cherokee words gatusi ("hill", "small mountain" or "high place") or gatu'gitse ("new settlement place").

Catoosa County is part of the Chattanooga, TN–GA Metropolitan Statistical Area.

History
On March 14, 2002, due to a one-time sudden fog, about 125 vehicles crashed, causing a pileup in interstate 75 that killed four people and injured 39.

On April 27, 2011, a devastating tornado touched down in the town of Ringgold, located in Catoosa County, leaving a path of severe destruction.

Geography
The entire county is located in the Middle Tennessee-Chickamauga sub-basin of the Middle Tennessee-Hiwassee basin.

Major highways

  Interstate 75
  U.S. Route 27
  U.S. Route 41
  U.S. Route 76
  State Route 1
  State Route 2
  State Route 3
  State Route 146
  State Route 151
  State Route 401 (unsigned designation for I-75)

Adjacent counties
 Hamilton County, Tennessee (north)
 Whitfield County (east)
 Walker County (west)

National protected areas
 Chattahoochee National Forest (part)
 Chickamauga and Chattanooga National Military Park (part)

Demographics

2000 census
As of the census of 2000, there were 53,282 people, 20,425 households, and 15,400 families living in the county. There were 21,794 housing units at an average density of 134 per square mile (52/km2). The racial makeup of the county was 96.39% White, 1.26% Black or African American, 0.31% Native American, 0.71% Asian, 0.02% Pacific Islander, 0.39% from other races, and 0.93% from two or more races.  1.17% of the population were Hispanic or Latino of any race.

There were 20,425 households, of which 35.40% had children under the age of 18 living with them, 60.60% were married couples living together, 11.00% had a female householder with no husband present, and 24.60% were non-families. 21.30% of all households were made up of individuals, and 8.50% had someone living alone who was 65 years of age or older.  The average household size was 2.59 and the average family size was 3.00.

In the county, the population was spread out, with 25.80% under the age of 18, 8.10% from 18 to 24, 30.80% from 25 to 44, 23.40% from 45 to 64, and 11.90% who were 65 years of age or older.  The median age was 36 years. For every 100 females there were 93.80 males.  For every 100 females age 18 and over, there were 90.20 males.

The median income for a household in the county was $39,998, and the median income for a family was $45,710. Males had a median income of $31,746 versus $23,790 for females. The per capita income for the county was $18,009.  About 6.40% of families and 9.40% of the population were below the poverty line, including 12.50% of those under age 18 and 11.00% of those age 65 or over.

2010 census
As of the 2010 United States Census, there were 63,942 people, 24,475 households, and 17,785 families living in the county. The racial makeup of the county was 93.6% white, 2.2% black or African American, 1.2% Asian, 0.3% American Indian, 0.1% Pacific islander, 1.0% from other races, and 1.6% from two or more races. Those of Hispanic or Latino origin made up 2.3% of the population.

Of the 24,475 households, 36.3% had children under the age of 18 living with them, 55.7% were married couples living together, 12.6% had a female householder with no husband present, 27.3% were non-families, and 23.1% of all households were made up of individuals. The average household size was 2.59 and the average family size was 3.05. The median age was 38.3 years.

The median income for a household in the county was $46,544 and the median income for a family was $54,796. Males had a median income of $39,962 versus $31,505 for females. The per capita income for the county was $22,563. About 8.5% of families and 11.2% of the population were below the poverty line, including 14.8% of those under age 18 and 9.0% of those age 65 or over.

2016
 the largest self-reported ancestry groups in Catoosa County, Georgia are:

2020 census

As of the 2020 United States census, there were 67,872 people, 24,130 households, and 17,293 families residing in the county.

Education

Catoosa County Public Schools

Elementary schools 
Battlefield Elementary School
Battlefield Primary School
Boynton Elementary School
Cloud Springs Elementary School
Graysville Elementary School
Ringgold Elementary School
Ringgold Primary School
Tiger Creek Elementary School
West Side Elementary School
Woodstation  Elementary School

Middle schools
Heritage Middle School
Lakeview Middle School
Ringgold Middle School

High schools
Heritage High School
Lakeview-Fort Oglethorpe High School
Ringgold High School
Performance Learning Center

Communities

Cities
 Fort Oglethorpe
 Ringgold

Town
 Tunnel Hill

Census-designated places
 Indian Springs
 Lakeview

Other unincorporated communities
 Graysville
 Woodstation

Politics

See also

 2011 Super Outbreak
 National Register of Historic Places listings in Catoosa County, Georgia
 Northwest Georgia Joint Development Authority
List of counties in Georgia

References

External links
 Official website
 Catoosa county, GA, genealogy
 Catoosa County historical marker
 Old Stone Presbyterian Church historical marker

 
1853 establishments in Georgia (U.S. state)
Georgia (U.S. state) counties
Georgia placenames of Native American origin
Chattanooga metropolitan area counties
Northwest Georgia (U.S.)
Counties of Appalachia
Populated places established in 1853